KF Bashkimi was a football club, which was played in the town of Kumanovo, North Macedonia. The club was dissolved before the 2008–09 Macedonian First League season, when they folded due to financial reasons.

A successor club which claims rights to Bashkimi's honours and records was established in 2011 under the same name. However, they are not legally considered to be successors to the original Bashkimi and the two clubs' track records and honours are kept separate by the Football Federation of Macedonia.

History
The club was founded in 1947 and represented the Albanian people, living in the city of Kumanovo (the word Bashkimi in Albanian means unity). But for the first time in the club's history in 2002/03 season the debuted in the First Macedonian League. They played in the league for 5 seasons. A few days before the start of the season 2008/09, despite staying in the competition last season, the club has been terminated because of the huge financial difficulties.

The best year in the club's history was the season 2004/05, when he finished sixth place in the  Macedonian First League and achieved the greatest success in its history, winning the Macedonian Cup. This allowed them to represent the country in the competition with UEFA Cup. In the first qualifying round eliminated the Bosnia and Herzegovina club NK Žepče, winning the first match by forfeit (because was Žepče fielded ineligible player) and the second leg 1–1 draw away from home. In the second round players of Bashkimi were nevertheless twice as high Israeli club Maccabi Petah Tikva 0–5 and 0–6 and were eliminated from further competition.

Supporters
FK Bashkimi supporters were called Ilirët.

Honours
Macedonian Second League:
 Winners (1): 2002–03

Macedonian Football Cup:
 Winners (1): 2004–05

Seasons

Bashkimi in Europe

Historical list of coaches

  Nexhat Husein (2002 - 2003)
  Mensur Nedžipi (2004 - Feb 2005)
  Buran Beadini (27 Feb 2005 - Oct 2005)
  Edmond Miha (10 Oct 2005 - Dec 2005)
  Bylbyl Sokoli (15 Dec 2005 - May 2006)
  Hisni Madzuni (Jul 2006 - Apr 2007)
  Erkan Jusuf (29 Apr 2007 - Dec 2007)
  Nedžat Šabani (16 Dec 2007 - Jun 2008)

References

External links
 Football Federation of Macedonia 

 
Defunct football clubs in North Macedonia
Football clubs in Kumanovo
Association football clubs established in 1947
Association football clubs disestablished in 2008
1947 establishments in the Socialist Republic of Macedonia
2008 disestablishments in the Republic of Macedonia
Albanian football clubs in North Macedonia